"Sobreviviré" ( is song recorded by Mónica Naranjo. Premiered on radio broadcasting on 26 February 2000, it is  the first single of the album Minage. The original lyrics were adapted by Naranjo's recurring collaborator José Manuel Navarro. It was produced by Phil Manzanera.

The song became a number 1 in Los 40 chart list on 6 May 2000. The song eventually became an LGBT anthem and marked the career of Mónica Naranjo.

References 

Spanish-language songs
2000 songs